Pumapunku or Puma Punku (Aymara and Quechua which literally means 'Gate of the Puma') is a 6th-century T-shaped and strategically aligned man-made terraced platform mound with a sunken court and monumental structure on top that is part of the Pumapunku complex, at the Tiwanaku Site near Tiwanacu, in western Bolivia. The Pumapunku complex is an alignment of plazas and ramps centered on the Pumapunku platform mound. Today the monumental complex on top of the platform mound lies in ruins. 

It is believed to date to AD 536. After Akapana, which is believed to be "Pumapunku's twin", Pumapunku was the second most important construction in Tiwanaku. Among all the names for the areas in Tiwanaku only the names "Akapana" and "Pumapunku" have historical relevance. At Pumapunku several miniature gates which are perfect replicas of once standing full-size gateways were found. Additionally to these miniature gateways, likely, at least five gateways (and several blind miniature gateways) were once (or were intended to be) integrated into the Pumapunku monumental complex. The foundation platform of Pumapunku supported as many as eight andesite gateways. The fragments of five andesite gateways with similar characteristics to the Gateway of the Sun were found.

Tiwanaku is significant in Inca traditions because it is believed to be the site where the world was created. In Aymara, Puma Punku's name means "Gate of the Puma". The Pumapunku complex consists of an unwalled western court, a central unwalled esplanade, a terraced platform mound that is faced with stone, and a walled eastern court.

At its peak, Pumapunku is thought to have been "unimaginably wondrous," adorned with polished metal plaques, brightly colored ceramic and fabric ornamentation, and visited by costumed citizens, elaborately dressed priests, and elites decked in exotic jewelry. Current understanding of this complex is limited due to its age, the lack of a written record, and the current deteriorated state of the structures due to treasure hunting, looting, stone mining for building stone and railroad ballast, and natural weathering.

History 
When the Spanish arrived at Tiwanaku there was still standing architecture at Pumapunku. Bernabé Cobo reports that one Gateway and one "window" was still standing on one of the platforms.

Description 
The Pumapunku is a terraced earthen mound faced with blocks.

The eastern edge of the Pumapunku is occupied by the Plataforma Lítica. This structure consists of a stone terrace  in dimension. This terrace is paved with multiple enormous stone blocks. Based on the specific gravity of the red sandstone from which it was carved, this stone slab is estimated to weigh 131 tonnes (144 short tons). The remarkable aspects of the sandstone slabs, including their size and smooth surfaces have drawn comments for several centuries.

The other stonework and facing of the Pumapunku consists of a mixture of andesite and red sandstone. Pumapunku's core consists of clay, while the fill under parts of its edge consists of river sand and cobbles instead of clay. Excavations documented "three major building epochs plus repairs and re-modeling".

The area within the kilometer separating the Pumapunku and Kalasasaya complexes was surveyed using ground-penetrating radar, magnetometry, induced electrical conductivity, and magnetic susceptibility. The geophysical data collected from these surveys and excavations indicate the presence of numerous man-made structures in the area between the Pumapunku and Kalasasaya complexes. These structures include the wall foundations of buildings and compounds, water conduits, pool-like features, revetments, terraces, residential compounds, and widespread gravel pavements, all of which are buried and hidden beneath the modern ground surface.

After the area was mapped with a drone in 2016, the results showed the site has a size of seventeen hectares of which only two hectares are unearthed. There are two additional platforms still underground.

Age 
Noted by Andean specialist, W. H. Isbell, professor at Binghamton University, a radiocarbon date was obtained by Vranich from organic material from the deepest and oldest layer of mound-fill forming the Pumapunku. This layer was deposited during the first of three construction epochs, and dates the initial construction of the Pumapunku to AD 536–600 (1510 ±25 B.P. C14, calibrated date). Since the radiocarbon date came from the deepest and oldest layer of mound-fill under the andesite and sandstone stonework, the stonework was probably constructed sometime after AD 536–600. The excavation trenches of Vranich show the clay, sand, and gravel fill of the Pumapunku complex were laid directly on the sterile middle Pleistocene sediments. These excavation trenches also demonstrated the lack of any pre-Andean Middle Horizon cultural deposits within the area of the Tiwanaku Site adjacent to the Pumapunku complex.

Engineering 

Its weight is estimated to be . Both of these stone blocks are part of the Plataforma Lítica, and are red sandstone.

Archaeologists dispute the transport of these stones was by the large labor force of ancient Tiwanaku. Several conflicting theories  attempt to imagine the ways this labor force transported the stones, although these theories remain speculative. Two common proposals involve the use of llama skin ropes, and the use of ramps and inclined planes.

In assembling the walls of Pumapunku, each stone interlocked with the surrounding stones. The blocks were fit together like a puzzle, forming load-bearing joints. Jean-Pierre Protzen and Stella Nair identified a 1 to 1.5 millimeters thick thin coat of whiteish material covering some of the stones as a possible layer of mortar. One common engineering technique involves cutting the top of the lower stone at a certain angle, and placing another stone on top of it which was cut at the same angle. The precision with which these angles create flush joints is indicative of sophisticated knowledge of stone-cutting and a thorough understanding of descriptive geometry. Many of the joints are so precise, a razor blade cannot fit between the stones. Much of the masonry is characterized by accurately cut rectilinear blocks of such uniformity, they could be interchanged for one another while maintaining a level surface and even joints. Although similar, the blocks do not have the same dimensions. The precise cuts suggest the possibility of pre-fabrication and mass production, technologies far in advance of the Tiwanaku’s Inca successors hundreds of years later. Some of the stones are in an unfinished state, showing some of the techniques used to shape them. The architectural historians Jean-Pierre and Stella Nair who conducted the first professional field study on the stones of Tiwanaku/Pumapunku conclude:

[…] to obtain the smooth finishes, the perfectly planar faces and exact interior and exterior right angles on the finely dressed stones, they resorted to techniques unknown to the Incas and to us at this time. […] The sharp and precise 90° interior angles observed on various decorative motifs most likely were not made with hammerstones. No matter how fine the hammerstone's point, it could never produce the crisp right interior angles seen on Tiahuanaco stonework. Comparable cuts in Inca masonry all have rounded interior angles typical of the pounding technique […]. The construction tools of the Tiahuanacans, with perhaps the possible exception of hammerstones, remain essentially unknown and have yet to be discovered.

According to Protzen and Nair, tools have never in history been excavated or identified that were used in the construction of Tiwanaku. According to the art historian Jessica Joyce Christie, the experiments of Jean-Pierre Protzen and Stella Nair showed that the Tiwanaku artisans may have possessed additional tools which facilitated the creation of exact geometric cuts and forms and of which archeology has no record at this time.

Tiwanaku engineers were also adept at developing a civic infrastructure at this complex, constructing functional irrigation systems, hydraulic mechanisms, and waterproof sewage lines.

Architecture 

Pumapunku was a large earthen platform mound with three levels of stone retaining walls. Its layout is not square in plan, but rather T-shaped. To sustain the weight of these massive structures, Tiwanaku architects were meticulous in creating foundations, often fitting stones directly to bedrock or digging precise trenches and carefully filling them with layered sedimentary stones to support large stone blocks. Modern engineers argue that base of Pumapunku was constructed using a technique called layering and depositing. By alternating layers of sand from the interior and layers of composite from the exterior, the fills overlap at the joints, grading the contact points to create a sturdy base.

Use of cramps 

Notable features at Pumapunku are I-shaped architectural cramps, composed of a unique copper-arsenic-nickel bronze alloy. These I-shaped cramps were also used on a section of canal found at the base of the terraced platform mound Akapana at Tiwanaku. These cramps hold the blocks comprising the walls and bottom of stone-lined canals to drain sunken courts. I-cramps of unknown composition were used to hold together the massive slabs forming Pumapunku's four large platforms. In the south canal of the Pumapunku, the I-shaped cramps were cast in place. In sharp contrast, the cramps used at the Akapana canal were fashioned by the cold hammering of copper-arsenic-nickel bronze ingots. The unique copper-arsenic-nickel bronze alloy is also found in metal artifacts within the region between Tiwanaku and San Pedro de Atacama during the late Middle Horizon around 600–900. Within Peru T-shaped sockets can also be found at the Qorikancha and Ollantaytambo. The cramp technique can also be found at buildings of Ancient Egypt (e. g. at the temple of Khnum) and Ancient Greece (e. g. at the Erechtheion). According to Stübel and Uhle the cramp sockets of Olympia and the Erechtheum in Athens are of the same shape that the ones of Tiwanaku. They call it "strikingly consistent choice of technical means" ("auffallend übereinstimmenden Wahl der technischen Mittel") which they think is due to "similar patterns in human way of thinking" ("Gesetzmässigkeit der menschlichen Denkentwickelung").

Possible connection to Ollantaytambo 

The architectural historian Jean-Pierre Protzen from University of California, Berkeley states that in the past it often haven been argued that among the buildings at Ollantaytambo the monumental structures (e. g. the Wall of the six monoliths) were the work of the earlier Tiwanaku culture and have been reused by the Incas:

An argument persists that the Wall of the six monoliths and the vanished structures from which the blocks have been recycled predate the Incas and were work of the earlier Tiahuanaco culture. Support for the argument is found in the step motif carved on the fourth monolith and the T-shape sockets cut into several blocks, both believed to be hallmarks of Tiahuanaco-style architecture. […] A variant of this argument is that Tiahuanacoid elements were brought to Ollantaytambo by […] stonemasons from Lake Titicaca. […] The only question here is why stonesmasons from Lake Titicaca should have remembered anything Tiahaunacoid when for several centuries nothing like it had been built. If anything remembers me of Tiahuanaco it is […] the T-shaped sockets and the regularly coursed masonry of strongly altered andesite. […] Many T-shaped sockets are indeed found at Tiahuanaco in particular at the site of Puma Punku […].

However, according to Protzen, in Ollantaytambo only T-shaped sockets are found, whereas in Tiwanaku cramp sockets of a wide range of shapes — L, T, double-T or ‡, U, Y, Z — and dimensions are found. Similarities between Ollantaytambo and Tiwanaku were also noticed by Heinrich Ubbelohde-Doering, Alphons Stübel and Max Uhle.

Gateways of Pumapunku

Full-sized gateways 
At least five gateways (and several blind miniature gateways) were once (or were intended to be) integrated into the Pumapunku monumental complex. The foundation platform of Pumapunku supported as many as eight andesite gateways. The fragments of five andesite gateways with similar characteristics to the Gateway of the Sun were found.

Miniature gateways 

There also exist miniature gateways at Pumapunku which are perfect replicas of once standing monumental full-sized gateways. When reducing the full-sized monumental architecture to miniature architecture the Tiahuanacans applied a specific formula. There also exist replicas of larger monumental structures. For example it has been shown that the much-admired carved block known as the "Escritorio del Inca" is an accurate and reduced-scale model of full-scale architecture. Some of these "model stones" like "little Pumapunku" are not isolates stones but, rather, seem to fit in the context of other stones and stone fragments. According to Protzen and Nair the fact that many of these "model stones" were executed in multiple exemplars bespeaks mass production.

Doubly curved lintels  
At Pumapunku and other areals of Tiwanaku such as Kantatayita doubly curved lintels with complicated surfaces were found. Jean-Pierre Protzen and Stella Nair point out that the "steep parabolic curve" of the doubly curved lintels (like the one of the Kantatayita lintel) would be difficult to replicate for modern stonemasons ("would tax any stonemason's skills today").

Sculptures 

There are at least two monoliths associated with the Pumapunku platform mound. One of these monoliths is the Pumapunku monolith (or Pumapunku stela). It was discovered west of the Pumapunku campus and first documented in photographs in 1876. There is evidence that like in the case of Akapana sculptures known as Chachapumas once were guarding the entrance to Pumapunku. Chachapumas usually were placed on andesite pedestals on either side of the entrance. These sculptures show fearsome traits of predatory animals, they crouch or kneel while clutching a human head in one hand and an axe in the other. Some authors believe that the Chachapumas demanded a "sacrifice" of humans when entering the monumental structures. Some authors believe, because of certain markings on stones found at Puma Punku, the Gate of the Sun was part of Puma Punku. According to Alan Kolata the terraced platform mound depicted on the gateway of the sun is actually a stylized depiction of Pumapunku.
The backside of the gateway of the sun has patterns which can be found on the stone slabs and gates of Pumapunku. Therefore some assume that the gateway of the sun once formed the main entrance to Pumapunku.

Roofs 

The roofs of the entrance to Pumapunku were most likely out of Totora-reed stones. At the west entrance of Pumapunku Totora-reed stones were found. Early visitors who saw standing architecture at Tiwanaku reported about stones which resemble "straw":

[…] [T]he roof of the hall, on the outside, looks like straw, although it is of stone. Because the Indians cover their houses with straw, and for this [room] to look like the others [houses], they dressed the stone and incised it so that it would appear like a cover of straw.

Large Totora-reed stones can be found in the museum at Tiwanaku.

Cultural and spiritual significance 
According to some theories, the Pumapunku complex and surrounding monumental structures like Akapana, Kalasasaya, Putuni, and Kerikala functioned as spiritual and ritual centers for the Tiwanaku. This area might be the center of the Andean world, attracting pilgrims from far away to marvel in its beauty. These structures transformed the local landscape; Pumapunku was integrated with Illimani mountain. The spiritual significance and the sense of wonder might be amplified into a "mind-altering and life-changing experience" through the use of hallucinogenic plants.  Examinations of hair samples exhibit remnants of psychoactive substances in many mummies found in Tiwanaku culture from Northern Chile, including babies as young as one year of age, demonstrating the importance of these substances to the Tiwanaku.

Peak and decline 
The Tiwanaku civilization and the use of these enclosures and platform mounds appears to peak from AD 700 to 1000, by which point, the city core and surrounding area could house 400,000 residents. During their peak centuries, the Tiwanaku culture dominated the Lake Titicaca basin as well as portions of Bolivia and Chile.

Apparently, this culture dissolved abruptly some time around AD 1000, and researchers can only guess the reasons. A likely scenario involves rapid onset extended drought. Unable to produce the massive crop yields necessary for their large population, the Tiwanaku apparently scattered into the local mountain ranges, then disappeared shortly thereafter. Apparently, Puma Punku was abandoned before its builders could complete it.

Atlantis and aliens enthusiasts 

Pumapunku is subject of pseudoscience theories on lost continents and extraterrestrial interventions. Thousands of websites and references which refer to pseudoscientific theories of alien and Atlantis enthusiasts exist. The archeologist Jeb J. Card notes that Pumapunku is a fixture of books and television programs on alternative archeology and especially ancient aliens. According to Card, Atlantis and aliens enthusiasts point to the fine-cut masonry and the location of Pumapunku in the high Altiplano as mysteries. The archeologist Alexei Vranich counters the ancient alien enthusiasts that well-preserved local precursors regarding the monumental complex of Pumapunku are now known (some monumental structures at Pukara and Chiripa). This fact is in his view "a solid piece of evidence" against the claims by ancient alien enthusiasts that hold Pumapunku as a best example of extraterrestrial technology, based in part on the idea that the form and design of the monumental complex of Pumapunku has no local precursors. The buildings at Chiripa (which are similar to buildings of Pumapunku) were identified as "storage bins" because impressions of baskets and remains of food were found. Vranich notes that generations of amateur, fringe and pseudo-archeologist claimed that the "apparent geometric perfection of Tiwanaku architecture" is a result of extraterrestrial intervention or a lost super civilization instead attributing the ruins to the inhabitants of the Titicaca basin. In the 2019 issue of Public Archaeology, Franco D. Rossi of Johns Hopkins University criticizes that ancient alien theorists have called the Aymara "stone age people" who could not have built Pumapunku.

Gallery

Bibliography 
 Alphons Stübel, Max Uhle: Die Ruinenstätte von Tiahuanaco im Hochlande des alten Peru. Breslau (1892), p. 25–28
 Jean-Pierre Protzen, Stella Nair: Who taught the Inca stonemasons their skills? A comparison of Tiahuanaco and Inca cut-stone masonry. The Journal of the Society of Architectural Historians (1997). Volume 56, Nr. 2
 Alexei Vranich: Interpreting the meaning of ritual spaces: the temple complex of Pumapunku, Tiwanaku, Bolivia. University of Pennsylvania, 1999.
 Jean-Pierre Protzen, Stella Nair: On Reconstructing Tiwanaku Architecture. The Journal of the Society of Architectural Historians (2000) Vol. 59
 Jean-Pierre Protzen, Stella Nair: The Gateways of Tiwanaku. Symbols or passages? In: Andean Archaeology II: Art, landscape and society. Helaine Silverman and William H. Isbell (ed.) Springer, Boston, MA, 2002. pages 189–223.
 Alexei Vranich: The construction and reconstruction of ritual space at Tiwanaku, Bolivia (AD 500–1000). Journal of Field Archaeology 31.2 (2006): 121–136.
 Jean-Pierre Protzen, Stella Nair: The Stones of Tiahuanaco: A Study of Architecture and Construction. Vol. 75. Cotsen Institute of Archaeology Press, University of California, Los Angeles (2013)
 Alexei Vranich, Charles Stanish: Advances in Titicaca Basin Archaeology-2. (2013), p. 140 ff.
 Alexei Vranich: Reconstructing ancient architecture at Tiwanaku, Bolivia: the potential and promise of 3D printing. Heritage Science 6.1 (2018): 1–20.

References

External links 

 Interactive Archaeological Investigation at Pumapunku Temple – Archaeological Institute of America
 

Archaeological sites in Bolivia
Buildings and structures in La Paz Department (Bolivia)
Indigenous topics of the Andes
Pre-Columbian architecture
Ruins in Bolivia
Tourist attractions in La Paz Department (Bolivia)
6th-century establishments in South America
11th-century disestablishments in South America
Tiwanaku culture